Led Zeppelin DVD is a double DVD set by the English rock band Led Zeppelin, released in the United Kingdom on 26 May 2003, and the United States on 27 May 2003. It contains live concert footage of the band spanning the years 1969 to 1979. The DVD includes performances from the Royal Albert Hall in 1970, Madison Square Garden in 1973, Earls Court in 1975, and Knebworth in 1979, plus other footage. Bootleg footage from some of the concerts is interspersed with the professionally shot material.

The DVD cover features West and East Mitten Buttes, photographed from the visitor centre at the Navajo Tribal Park located at Monument Valley, Arizona.

Background and production
Led Zeppelin guitarist and producer of the DVD, Jimmy Page, commenced work on the project in the early 2000s. While fans had been trading poor quality versions of Led Zeppelin video material for years, this was the first official archival video release to contain any footage of the band playing live. In an interview he gave after the release of the DVD, Page explained the impetus behind the project:

The reason for [the DVD] was that there was no visual material [of the band] that was out there really. The studio albums had been put out in many different shapes and forms, but this was something that was sorely missing because [Led] Zeppelin built its material on live performances. So that had to be done.

The idea for a live chronology had, however, dated back some time before this, according to singer Robert Plant in 2003:

The idea of creating a Led Zeppelin collage has been in the works for ... fifteen years. We just didn't really have the time to put it together as a project because there was so much concentrated work that was required. So, as we all finished our individual projects, Jimmy Page took the helm along with some technical guys and this is what we've got.

For the DVD, Page collaborated with music producer Kevin Shirley, with whom Page worked when he was performing with The Black Crowes. Shirley recalled:

I produced the Black Crowes, and Jimmy joined them for a run of live dates in 1999. I saw the show in New York, and then I went to California and recorded the shows, took the tapes away, and fixed them up a little and mixed them. I did Live at the Greek without any input from anyone, as it wasn't originally going to be an official release. But I think everyone was impressed with it; certainly Jimmy said he was. Then, when Jimmy decided to do a new [Led Zeppelin] DVD, he started looking for someone familiar with the modern applications necessary for surround sound mixing. If you listen to the Royal Albert Hall [concert] opening in 5.1, you can see Jimmy had this audio concept really early on of giving people a sense of the band going onstage and the audience swells around you. We had a meeting to discuss the requirements needed for the DVD project audio, and afterward, he asked if I would be interested in ‘helping’ him.

Page, with Shirley and the producer and creative director Dick Carruthers, worked for the best part of a year to research, compile, load, mix and present the material. Much of the footage which was included on the DVD was painstakingly restored for several months, before being mixed at Sarm West Studios in London. In all, 132 cans of film and two sets of two-inch video tape were examined for the project. In order to view material on the two-inch Quadruplex videotapes, a suitable playback machine had to be located. A working Quadruplex machine was finally found in Singapore.

Some of the video tapes suffered from a common fault called sticky-shed syndrome where the bonding agent holding the magnetic particles to the tape backing decomposes to the point where the oxide is scraped off during playback. The tapes consequently had to be restored by baking them in ovens at 55 °C (131 °F) for three weeks in order for them to be played back. The audio portions were digitally remixed for stereo and 5.1 surround mixes.

Critical reception

Upon its release the DVD received positive reviews. Michael Azerrad of Rolling Stone magazine gave the DVD four (out of four) stars, describing it as the "Holy Grail of heavy metal" and "one of the best rock documentaries ever made."

Commercial performance
The RIAA certified Led Zeppelin DVD at 13 times multi-platinum (1,300,000 copies sold in the United States). According to the BBC, the DVD broke all sales records for a music video, nearly three times as many in the first week of sales as the previous record holder. It was, for three years, the highest selling music DVD in the United States.

Track listing

Menu clips
Royal Albert Hall, 9 January 1970
Dressing room (pre-concert) – 0:27
"Thank You" (Page/Plant) (organ outro excerpt) – 0:34
 "Heartbreaker" (guitar solo) – 0:36 (collage)

Reykjavik Airport, 22 June 1970
"Moby Dick" (Bonham/Jones/Page) (drum solo excerpt) – 0:56 (collage)

Laugardalshöll, 22 June 1970
"Dazed and Confused" (Page; inspired by Jake Holmes) (guitar bowing solo)

Sydney Showground, 27 February 1972
"Black Dog" (Page/Plant/Jones) – 0:36

Madison Square Garden, 27 July 1973
"Since I've Been Loving You" (Jones/Page/Plant) – 0:49

Madison Square Garden, 28 July 1973 (Knebworth campsite on 4 August 1979, video clip)
"Over the Hills and Far Away" (Page/Plant) – 2:23

Seattle Center Coliseum, 21 March 1975
"Whole Lotta Love (medley)" (Page/Bonham/Plant/Jones) (theremin solo and "The Crunge" excerpt from Earls Court, 25 May 1975) – 0:48

Earls Court, 24 May 1975 (streets of Belfast on 5 March 1971, clip)
"Bron-Yr-Aur Stomp" (Page/Plant/Jones) – 0:49

Earls Court, 25 May 1975
"Stairway to Heaven" (Page/Plant) (guitar intro) – 0:54 (collage edit)

LA Forum, 21 June 1977 (8 mm video clips from various 1977 performances)
"The Song Remains the Same" (Page/Plant) – 5:37

Charts

Certifications

Personnel
Led Zeppelin
John Bonham – drums, percussion
John Paul Jones – bass guitar, keyboards, Mellotron, mandolin
Robert Plant – vocals, harmonica
Jimmy Page – electric and acoustic guitars, production, creative director

Technical
Dick Carruthers – production, creative director
Kevin Shirley – sound engineering

Technical notes
LPCM stereo (1536 kbit/s), Dolby Digital 5.1 surround sound, DTS 5.1 surround sound. Menu: Dolby Digital 2.0 stereo, Extras: Dolby Digital 2.0 stereo

References

External links

The Garden Tapes – in-depth analysis of the track edits on the DVD
In-depth discussion of the making of the soundtrack with mixer Kevin Shirley, by Paul Tingen published in Sound on Sound magazine, November 2003.

2003 video albums
Albums produced by Jimmy Page
Atlantic Records video albums
Led Zeppelin video albums
Live video albums
Folk rock video albums